Garcia Live Volume Two is an album by the Jerry Garcia Band.  It was recorded live on August 5, 1990, at the Greek Theatre in Berkeley, California.  It was released by ATO Records on June 25, 2013, in two formats — as a two-disc CD, and as a digital download.

The lineup of the Jerry Garcia Band for this concert — and for most of the band's shows from 1985 to 1995 — was Jerry Garcia on guitar and vocals, Melvin Seals on keyboards, John Kahn on bass, David Kemper on drums, and Jaclyn LaBranch and Gloria Jones on background vocals.  Béla Fleck sat in on banjo for the first two songs of the second set.

Rosebud, one of Garcia's guitars, is depicted on the album cover.

Garcia Live Volume Two was released as a four-disc LP, in a limited edition of 4,000 copies, on November 27, 2020, in conjunction with Record Store Day Black Friday.

Critical reception

On Allmusic, Fred Thomas said, "Though it was recorded a full decade after the first installment of this Dick's Picks-like concert archive series, Vol. 2 shares a lot of the same songs from the set list of Vol. 1.... though the feel of the set is far more jammy, summery, and laid-back than Vol. 1, which was bluesy and amped by relative Garcia standards. The protracted and stumbly vibe of the set presented here evokes the archetypal languid outdoor concert energy that the Grateful Dead all but defined in their endless touring, and Garcia's takes on roots rock classics by The Band, Van Morrison, and later-period Dylan help capture the stoned summertime musical snapshot all the more. What truly sets this volume apart from its predecessor is the guest spot by banjo virtuoso Béla Fleck on two songs..."

Track listing
Disc 1
First set:
"How Sweet It Is (To Be Loved by You)" (Brian Holland, Lamont Dozier, Eddie Holland) – 7:33
"Stop That Train" (Peter Tosh) – 6:47
"Forever Young" (Bob Dylan) – 7:20
"Run for the Roses" (Jerry Garcia, Robert Hunter) – 5:50
"That's What Love Will Make You Do" (James Banks, Eddie Marion, Henderson Thigpen) – 8:06
"My Sisters and Brothers" (Charles Johnson) – 4:15
"Tears of Rage" (Richard Manuel, Dylan) – 8:16
"Deal" (Garcia, Hunter) – 8:34
Disc 2
Second set:
"Midnight Moonlight" (Peter Rowan) – 7:26
"The Harder They Come" (Jimmy Cliff) – 10:46
"And It Stoned Me" (Van Morrison) – 6:21
"Waiting for a Miracle" (Bruce Cockburn) – 6:43
"Evangeline" (David Hidalgo, Louie Pérez) – 4:22
"Think" (Jimmy McCracklin, Deadric Malone) – 7:01
"That Lucky Old Sun" (Beasley Smith, Haven Gillespie) – 8:22
"Tangled Up in Blue" (Dylan) – 11:19

Personnel
Jerry Garcia Band
Jerry Garcia – guitar, vocals
Melvin Seals – keyboards
John Kahn – bass
David Kemper – drums
Jaclyn LaBranch – vocals
Gloria Jones – vocals
Additional musicians
Béla Fleck – banjo on "Midnight Moonlight", "The Harder They Come"
Production
Produced for release by Marc Allan, Joe Gastwirt
Original recordings produced by Jerry Garcia
Executive producer: Coran Capshaw
Recording, engineering: John Cutler
Mastering: Joe Gastwirt
Art direction, design, illustration: Ryan Corey
Photography: Susana Millman

References

Jerry Garcia Band live albums
2013 live albums
Music of the San Francisco Bay Area
ATO Records live albums